St. Thomas Mount railway station, or Mount railway station, is one of the railway stations of the Chennai Beach–Chengalpattu section of the Chennai Suburban Railway Network. It serves the neighbourhood of St. Thomas Mount and Pazhavanthangal, which are suburbs of Chennai.

The station is also an integrated railway station for all the three modes of rail transport in the city, namely, Chennai suburban railway, MRTS, and Metro Rail. The MRTS part is under construction.

Integrated Terminus 

St. Thomas Mount Metro station is a Metro-cum-MRTS railway station on the Green Line of the Chennai Metro. The station is an elevated station abutting the surface-level St. Thomas Mount suburban station of the Chennai Suburban Railway Network. The metro level of the station started functioning on 14 October 2016 while the MRTS level is under construction.

The new terminal is envisaged as an integrated railway station for all the three modes of rail transport in the city, namely, Chennai Beach—Chengalpattu section of the Chennai Suburban Railway, terminal point of Chennai Beach—St. Thomas Mount MRTS, and Chennai Central–St. Thomas Mount Metro Rail.

Layout
It is planned to design, the proposed elevated St Thomas Mount Metro Rail station, as a 'signature station' that would integrate all the 3 suburban rail modes of the city, at multiple levels.
The integrated station will have three levels, namely, ground level for suburban station, level 1 for MRTS, and level 2 for Metro Rail. The length of the platform at the Metro station will be 140 m and the entire station complex will have a total built-up area of 48,000 sq m.

Level-0 – New suburban rail platform
The existing suburban station at ground level can be accessed from new terminal using a foot overbridge. According to officials of Chennai Metro Rail Limited (CMRL), they will soon start work on the construction of this foot-over-bridge and complete it before commissioning of the station.

As per the new design, the elevated station will have a Metro Rail station on the top floor, followed by an MRTS station a level below and then a vast concourse area for commuters to switch over to these two modes or to step down to the ground level, which will house – new ground level platform – for suburban trains, within the new Station block.

Level-1 – Concourse for mixing of Passengers
The concourse will have ticket booths and escalators and lifts will take commuters to the platforms above.

Level-2 – MRTS rail 
The MRTS will be at a height of 12 m.

Level-3 – Metro rail 
The station is among the elevated stations coming up along corridor II of the Chennai Metro, Chennai Central–St. Thomas Mount stretch. The station will be the largest of the elevated stations of the Chennai Metro and will come up at a height of 23 m.

Station Layout (Metro)

History
The station lies in the Chennai Beach–Tambaram section of the Chennai Suburban Railway Network, the first suburban section of the city. With the completion of track-lying work in March 1931, which began in 1928, the suburban services were started on 11 May 1931 between Beach and Tambaram, and was electrified on 15 November 1931, with the first MG EMU services running on 1.5 kV DC. The section was converted to 25 kV AC traction on 15 January 1967.

As of 2012, an integrated terminal for Chennai Metro and MRTS is under construction at the station complex at a cost of  780 million. The construction is expected to be completed by September 2013. The  780-million contract for the construction of the station was initially awarded to Consolidated Construction Consortium Limited (CCCL). However, owing to delay the contract was terminated and is being given to a new contractor.
With the first service of Chennai Metro between Koyambedu and Alandur opened for public use – on 29 June 2015 – the Chennai Metro Rail Limited (CMRL) has now shifted the focus on laying the track up to St. Thomas Mount.

Future
With the integration of five modes of public transport – suburban railway, Southern Railway, Metro Rail, MRTS and public buses the station is expected to become the city's largest transit hub after Chennai Central.

Access Roads
A two-lane circular road has also been planned around the station so that buses can pick up commuters.
Anticipating increased patronage upon the completion of Metro Rail, the Medavakkam-Madipakkam road that runs in front of the station is being widened. It is expected that MRTS and metro rail services will together bring in more than 100,000 commuters at the station.

Parking
Parking facility include 10,000 sq m space at the ground level and provisions for 3,000 two-wheelers at level 1. Upon completion, the station will be the third largest in the city after Chennai Central and Chennai Egmore.

Express Train halt
In June 2013, Southern Railway started the ground work to extend platforms at the station to halt express trains. A spare platform of the station, which is being used to park old rakes, is being extended at an estimated cost of  60 million. The platform, which can currently take only 22-coach trains, will be expanded to handle 24-rake trains and a link track will be laid.

See also

 Railway stations in Chennai
 List of Chennai metro stations
 Chennai Suburban Railway
 Chennai Metro

References

External links
 St. Thomas Mount railway station on IndiaRailInfo.com
 Official website for Chennai Metro Rail Limited

Railway stations in Chennai
Stations of Chennai Suburban Railway
Chennai Metro stations